After winning the 1992 and 1993 contests with female soloists, Ireland selected Paul Harrington and Charlie McGettigan to represent them in 1994.

Before Eurovision

National final
The national final was held in the University Concert Hall in Limerick on 13 March 1994. TV broadcaster and Eurovision Song Contest 1988 co-presenter Pat Kenny hosted the event. The eight songs presented were then voted on by ten regional juries.

Charlie McGettigan had previously competed in Ireland's national final selection in 1984 and 1987, placing third both times.

At Eurovision
"Rock 'n' Roll Kids" was performed third in the running order on the night of the contest, following Finland and preceding Cyprus. The song went on to win the contest with 226 points, a 60-point lead over runner-up Poland. This was Ireland's third win in a row, and sixth overall. Both were Eurovision records - no country had previously managed to win three years in a row.

Voting

References

1994
Countries in the Eurovision Song Contest 1994
Eurovision
Eurovision